Joseph Roduit (December 17, 1939 – December 17, 2015) was a Roman Catholic priest and abbot.

Roduit was ordained a priest for the Swiss Congregation of Canon Regulars of Saint Maurice of Agaune on September 4, 1965. From 1999 until 2015, Rodult served as abbot of the Saint-Maurice d'Agaune, Switzerland. Roduit retired on March 18, 2015.

Notes

1939 births
2015 deaths
Canonical Augustinian abbots and priors